Karl August Hermann (23 September 1851  – 11 January 1909) was an Estonian writer, publicist, linguist and composer.

Biography
Hermann was born in Võhmanõmme, Põltsamaa Parish, Kreis Fellin in 1851. He studied at the Faculty of Theology of the University of Tartu from 1875. He studied linguistics at Leipzig University from 1878, graduating in 1880 and defending his PhD thesis, "Der einfache Wortstamm und die drei Lautstufen in der estnischen Sprache".

From 1882 to 1885 he was an editor for Eesti Postimees. In 1886 he acquired the newspaper Perno Postimees, renaming it Postimees, which began publication in Tartu. In 1906, he acquired the newspaper Valgus.

He belonged to the Society of Estonian Literati and was an honorary alumnus of the Estonian Students' Society.

He died in 1909 in Tartu, and is buried in Tartu Raadi Cemetery.

Works
In 1884, he published Eesti keele grammatika (Estonian Grammar). In 1900 he started to publish Eesti Üleüldise teaduse raamat ehk encyklopädia konversationi-lexikon, but only the first volume was published in full.

He composed around 300 choral songs, including "Kungla rahvas" ('Kungla people') and "Oh laula ja hõiska" ('O sing and shout').

In 1895 Karl August Hermann published a book in which he argued that Sino-Uralic and Altaic form one large linguistic family.

References

1851 births
1909 deaths
People from Põltsamaa Parish
People from Kreis Fellin
Estonian male writers
19th-century Estonian writers
Linguists from Estonia
Estonian composers
19th-century Estonian composers
University of Tartu alumni
Burials at Raadi cemetery